Steve Loney (born April 26, 1952) is a former American football coach who is the offensive line coach for the Pittsburgh Maulers of the United States Football League (USFL). He was the offensive line coach for the Minnesota Vikings from 2003 to 2005, the Arizona Cardinals in 2006, and the St. Louis Rams from 2008 to 2011. Additionally, his highest coaching assignment in the National Football League (NFL) was as the offensive coordinator of the Vikings in 2005 under head coach Mike Tice. He held the dual role of offensive coordinator and offensive line coach at his alma mater Iowa State University from 1995 to 1997 and 2000 to 2001, and at the University of Minnesota from 1998 to 1999.

Loney was the head football coach at Morehead State University from 1981 to 1983. He was the head football coach at Drake University for one season, in 2007, compiling a record of 6–5.

Loney  is the author of a book titled 101 Offensive Line Drills, a book focusing on offensive line drills.

Head coaching record

References

1952 births
Living people
American football offensive linemen
Arizona Cardinals coaches
Colorado State Rams football coaches
UConn Huskies football coaches
Dallas Cowboys coaches
Drake Bulldogs football coaches
Iowa State Cyclones football coaches
Iowa State Cyclones football players
Minnesota Golden Gophers football coaches
Minnesota Vikings coaches
Missouri Western Griffons football coaches
Morehead State Eagles football coaches
St. Louis Rams coaches
Tampa Bay Buccaneers coaches
The Citadel Bulldogs football coaches
High school football coaches in Kansas
Sportspeople from Marshalltown, Iowa
Pittsburgh Maulers (2022) coaches